This is a list of notable schools located in Somaliland by region.

Primary and secondary education
Education in Somaliland is provided in public and private schools. Education in Somaliland is managed by Ministry of Education and Science which controls the development and administration of state schools, it also has an advisory and supervisory role in private schools.

Awdal
 Sh. Ali Jawhar Secondary School Borama
 A.H. Cardaale Secondary School, Borama
 Aayatiin Secondary School, Borama
 MBK International School, Borama
 Ubaya Binu Ka'ab Secondary School, Borama
 Al Huda Primary and Secondary School, Borama
 Omer Binu Khadab Secondary School, Borama
 Waaberi School, Borama
 Al-Aqsa Secondary School, Borama
 East Africa Star School, Borama
 Harawa secondary school (Borama)
 Iftin primary school (Borama)
 sh.elmi talan secondary school(Qunujeed)
 Al-Qalam secondary School,(Borama)

Maroodi Jeex quule aden dool secondary school
 British International College & School, Hargeisa https://britishinternationalcolleges.com/
 AMAANO BOARDING AND DAY SCHOOL, Hargeisa https://amaanoboarding.com/
 Abu Huraira High School, Hargeisa
 Noradin School, Hargeisa
 British Canadian International School, Hargeisa
 Today School, Hargeisa
 Tomorrow School, Hargeisa
 ELM Schools in Hargeisa
 Sky Schools in Hargeisa
 Scie Tech Academy, Hargeisa
 Kuwait Educational Charity Complex for Girls, Hargeisa
 Bahrain Secondary School, Hargeisa
 Future Secondary School, Hargeisa
 Ilays School, Hargeisa
 Gaandi Secondary School, Hargeisa
 Pharo KG and Primary School, Hargeisa
 Mohamed Adan Sheef Secondary School, Hargeisa
 Farah Omaar Secondary School in Hargeisa
 British Islamic Academy, Hargeisa
Dayib Gurey Secondary School, Hargeisa
 Salaama Secondary School, Hargeisa
 Mu'assasatu Aflax, Hargeisa
 Al-Huda Primary and Intermediate School, Hargeisa
 Al Irshaad Secondary School, Hargeisa
 Taj KG and Primary Schools, Hargeisa
 Ubax International School, KG & Primary School Hargeisa
 Hamdan Secondary School, Hargeisa
 Abaarso School of Science and Technology in Abaarso 
 Arabsiyo Secondary School, Arabsiyo 
 Badbaado Secondary School, Arabsiyo
 Qalax High Comprehensive Secondary School, Gabiley
 Shaafici Secondary School, Gebiley
 Mahdi Ali Primary School, Tog Wajaale
 26 june secondary school, Hargeisa
Al Daarayn Modern School, Hargeisa
Sh.ibrahim sh.yusuf sh.madar[ex ga'an libah] secondary school, hargeisa
Blooming secondary school, Hargeisa
Zaynab Mukhtar Primary School [Hargeisa]
SuMaya School of Adiquite [Hargeisa]

Sahil
 Pharo Secondary School, Sheikh, Somaliland
 Bursade Secondary School, Berbera
C/Salam Secondary School, Berbera
Hira Secondary School, Berbera
Salwa Sabah Secondary School, Sheikh
Dabayl Wayne Secondary School, Berbera
Imam Shafi’ Primary & Intermediate School, Berbera
Umar ibn al-Khattab Primary & Intermediate School, Berbera
Sahil Primary & Intermediate School, Berbera
Hasan Ali Awale Primary & Intermediate School, Berbera
Mujahid Umar Toori Primary & Intermediate School, Berbera
Mohamed Shire Gaab Secondary School, Sheikh
Sa’id Da’ud Primary & Intermediate School, Berbera 
Mahmoud Handulle Primary & Intermediate School, Berbera

Sanaag
 Haji Adan Secondary School, Erigavo
 Safa Primary & Secondary School, Erigavo
 Shaafici Primary & Secondary School, Erigavo
 Dayaxa Secondary School, Erigavo
 Yufle Secondary School, Yufle
 Daalo Primary School, Erigavo
 Dayaxa Boarding Secondary School, Dayaha
 Abdi Hussein Mataan Secondary School, Erigavo
 Imamu Malik Secondary School, Erigavo
 Surud Primary School,   Erigavo
 xidig secondary school {Erigavo}
 jeembar primary and intermediate school {Erigavo}
dayaxa primary school {Erigavo}

Sool
 Muse Yusuf Secondary School, Las Anod
Gateway Secondary School, Las Anod
 Ilays Educational Academy, Las Anod
 Nugaal Secondary School, Las Anod
 Jeerin Secondary School, Taleh
 Tukaraq Secondary School, Tukaraq
Yagoori Secondary school, Yagoori

Togdheer
 Smart Schools, Burao
Sheikh Bashir School, Burao
 Qaadi-Mahamud School, Burao
 Sheikh Ibrahim School, Burao
 Ilays School, Burao
 Iftin Primary School, Burao
 Togdheer Secondary School, Burao
 Dayaxa Secondary School, Burao
 Albayaan School, Burao
 Geeska Africa Secondary School, Burao
Qoryaale Secondary school
Dhagaxdher Secondary school
 Odweyne Boading School, Oodweyne
 Darwiish School, Bohotle
 Hawd Secondary School, Bohotle
 Abu Bakar AlSidiiq School, Bohotle

See also

 Education in Somaliland
 Ministry of Education and Science (Somaliland) 
 Lists of schools Marif Secondary schools

References

Schools
 
Somaliland
Schools
Schools